Dharma & Greg is an American television sitcom that originally aired on ABC from September 24, 1997, until April 30, 2002, for 119 episodes over five seasons.

The show starred Jenna Elfman and Thomas Gibson as Dharma and Greg Montgomery, a couple who married on their first date despite being polar opposites. The series was co-produced by Chuck Lorre Productions, More-Medavoy Productions and 4 to 6 Foot Productions in association with 20th Century Fox Television for ABC. The show's theme song was written and performed by composer Dennis C. Brown.

Created by executive producers Dottie Dartland and Chuck Lorre, the comedy took much of its inspiration from culture-clash "fish out of water" situations. The show earned eight Golden Globe nominations, six Emmy Award nominations, and six Satellite Award nominations. Elfman earned a Golden Globe in 1999 for Best Actress.

Show summary 
Free-spirited yoga instructor/dog trainer Dharma Finkelstein and straight-laced lawyer Greg Montgomery marry on their first date despite being complete opposites. Their conflicting views lead to comical situations. Ivy League Greg was raised by wealthy, conservative parents. After graduation from Harvard and Stanford, he went to work with the U.S. Attorney's Office as a federal prosecutor in San Francisco. He then meets Dharma, who was raised by hippie parents. They fall in love immediately and elope. Despite being totally different, their parents eventually learn to tolerate each other.

Cast

Main 
 Jenna Elfman as Dharma Freedom Montgomery, née Finkelstein, Greg's wife, a flower child and somewhat hippie. She is overly cheerful and sensitive, and more compassionate and forgiving than many people. Despite her trust in the goodness of people and persistent good intentions, Dharma is not naive. She understands the real world, employs sarcasm and receives it well. Dharma perseveres in expressing her personality and her identity even in the sometimes opposing world. Dharma encourages Greg to seek happiness rather than fret about practical issues like money. She was named after the concept of dharma in Indian philosophy. A Native American friend of her father gave her the name "Crazy Man's Daughter". She addresses both of her parents by their first names. A somewhat darker side of her personality is revealed during episodes in which she plays pranks on people without appearing to show any concern for how her behavior might be affecting them. According to Chuck Lorre's eleventh vanity card (see below), he and Dottie Dartland originally conceived Dharma & Greg as "a series revolving around a woman whose personality is not a neurotic product of societal and parental conditioning, but of her own free-flowing, compassionate mind".
 Thomas Gibson as lawyer Gregory Clifford "Greg" Montgomery, Dharma's husband. He is somewhat uptight, decent, though surprisingly open-minded at times. Greg grew up in a conservative Republican family. Greg's life was hopelessly banal before he met Dharma, and married her on their first date. Since then, he has played the straight man to the antics of his eccentric wife. Though his relationship with Dharma has its challenging moments, Greg has never regretted his marriage to Dharma. He is also very educated; an alumnus of elite schools Phillips Exeter Academy, Harvard University, and Stanford Law School.
 Susan Sullivan as Katherine "Kitty" Montgomery, Greg's extravagant mother. In the beginning of the first season Kitty was generally represented as a manipulative, controlling woman who only had high aspirations for her son Greg. As an elite socialite, Kitty was initially displeased to have Dharma and her parents join the family, but over the course of the series, Kitty broadens her world to become part of a larger family, becoming a major part of Dharma's life, while remaining lovingly manipulative. Despite their vast differences, she recognizes Dharma's place in their family's life, once telling her "We both know you're not the girl I would have picked for Greg. What matters is that you are the girl that Greg did pick."
 Mitchell Ryan as Edward Montgomery, Greg's eccentric father. His philosophy for dealing with his wife Kitty involves remaining as uninvolved as possible. Head of Montgomery Industries (though he keeps working only because he can see little tugboats out the window) and at odds with Dharma's father, who calls him "Ed", but whom in return he calls "Finkelstein". Edward is a graduate of the University of Notre Dame, of which he is fiercely proud, and partially resents Greg for considering Notre Dame to not be "good enough" for him. Ed is often seen drinking martinis and Scotch.
 Mimi Kennedy as Abigail Kathleen "Abby" O'Neil, Dharma's free-spirited, caring mother, who encourages her daughter and son-in-law to produce children, stating, "Feel free to have sex anywhere." Although they have a grown daughter (Dharma) and later a son, Abby and Dharma's father Larry are not married. She and Larry were engaged and held the wedding ceremony, but still did not marry to "stay under the radar". Unlike her "lifemate" Larry, she immediately accepted Greg, though she still constantly annoys and conflicts with his parents. She is a militant vegan, which is a never-ending source of trouble. During her pregnancy in season 4, however, she did make exceptions because of her food cravings. It was mentioned in the episode "Invasion of the Buddy Snatcher" that she has a degree in ornithological psychology from Berkeley.
 Alan Rachins as Myron Lawrence "Larry" Finkelstein, Dharma's hippie father. He is a stereotypical sixties radical who frequently rants about various conspiracies, a lot of which revolve around Richard Nixon. He also thinks he's wanted by the FBI, but when Greg discovers he's not, his family goes to great lengths to prove to him that he still is because this is a source of great pride to him. Despite this, he manages to get along with Edward, often when both are sick of dealing with their wives. He homeschooled Dharma in American history, passing on his conspiracy theories, such as the latest Apollo mission secretly burying the missing minutes of the Watergate tapes on the moon. It is often alluded to that Larry is a chronic user of marijuana, though never shown. In the season 4 episode "Mother Daughter Reunion", Dharma mentions that Larry has a resistance against most drugs after frequent use. In the pilot episode Abby introduces his usual cluelessness with "he blew out his short term memory back in 1972". He sometimes becomes a "pothead savant" and reveals skills such as his talent for carpentry and his music.
 Shae D'lyn as Jane Deaux (seasons 1–4; guest season 5), Dharma's friend, a Canadian who frequently changes her hair color, going from black to red to blonde over the course of the show. Jane often joins Dharma in playing pranks on people around them, including their neighbors and clerks at shopping malls. She considers all men more or less evil, yet she married Pete Cavanaugh in Season 2, attempting to divorce him after only six weeks. They eventually divorced in the premiere of the fourth season. D'Lyn, while still listed in the opening credits of the show, began making fewer and fewer appearances as Jane in the second half of the fourth season, appearing in only 5 of that season's final 13 episodes. D'Lyn was then dropped from the starring cast, and made only one appearance in season five (during the second episode of the season). After that, the character of Jane disappeared without explanation.
 Joel Murray as Peter James "Pete" Cavanaugh, Greg's friend and colleague at the Justice Department. A particularly bad, lazy lawyer, he was married to Jane for a time. His entire life can be summed up by the interior of his apartment: a massage chair surrounded by empty take-out containers, next to which is a small refrigerator and a stack of porno tapes. A high-class entertainment center is in front of this. It is said he wears adult diapers to football games. Greg once said of his friend: "Pete went to law school in Barbados; he failed the Bar eight times. The last time because he threw up on the exam." In season 1, he mentions that he worked as a plumber's assistant during college. Pete marries Jane in the second season because neither of them wants to be alone on Valentine's Day.
 Helen Greenberg as Marcie (season 5; guest seasons 3–4), one of Dharma's co-op friends. Marcie is a good-hearted, nasal-voiced and somewhat nervously mousy receptionist whose vocabulary seems to primarily consist of the words "I'm sorry". Marcie was seen on a sporadically recurring basis starting near the end of season 3. In season five, Greenberg's name was added to the main cast list for episodes in which she appeared, although she was only seen in about a third of the season's episodes. Greenberg also played a different character in the episode "Drop Dead Gorgeous".
 Susan Chuang as Susan Wong (season 5; guest seasons 3–4), another one of Dharma's friends from the co-op, often (though not always) seen in tandem with Marcie. Unlike Marcie, Susan is much more self-confident and take-charge—sometimes to excess. Susan also pulls a "Dharma & Greg" with a lawyer, Darrell Gottlieb, hired by Kitty in a community garden spat (her wedding, along with Dharma's accident, was the Season 4 finale). The character of Susan was seen on a sporadically recurring basis starting near the end of season 3. In season five, Chuang's name was added to the main cast list for episodes in which she appeared—but like Greenberg, she was only seen in about a third of the season's episodes. Also like Greenberg, Chuang debuted on D&G playing a different character, in this case in the episode "Looking for the Goodbars".

Recurring 
 Lillian Hurst as Celia: Kitty and Edward's Hispanic maid. She is given constant support from Larry, who views her as "oppressed". When Kitty and Edward are out of town, Celia and her family move into the Montgomerys' mansion and invite their friends over, pretending it is their house.
 Yeardley Smith as Marlene: Greg's legal secretary whom he fired and then re-hired. She is snide, rude, and a bad secretary in general, though a better "lawyer" than Pete.
 Floyd Westerman as George Littlefox: an elderly Native American, who came to live with Dharma and Greg in the episode "Indian Summer"; he died at the end of the episode, but his ghost sometimes appears to Dharma to offer her advice.
 Kathryn Joosten as Claire: an elderly woman who works in Dharma's co-op, along with Susan and Marcie. Seen only in seasons 3 and 4.
 J.D. Walsh as Donald: a high school (later college) student who lives in Dharma and Greg's building. He is often given (occasionally unsolicited) advice from Dharma, and sometimes Greg. Seen in seasons 2–5.
 Kevin Sorbo as Charlie: a university professor going through a divorce who falls in love with Dharma. His affections, particularly a love letter and offering to drive Dharma home on a rainy day, causes Greg to briefly move in with Pete. The season 4 story-line was considered a risk and creator Lorre said that "while they won't destroy the marriage, they will threaten it", possibly alienating fans and destroying the show.

Episodes

Awards and nominations 
In 1998, the Online Film & Television Association Awards nominated Elfman for Best Actress in a Comedy Series and the series itself as Best New Comedy Series.

Jenna Elfman was nominated three times for Best Television Actress – Musical/Comedy Series at the Golden Globes and won in 1999. Thomas Gibson and Susan Sullivan were both nominated for Golden Globes but neither ever won the award. The show itself was nominated for Best Best Musical/Comedy Series in 1998 and 1999.

Ratings and cancellation 

The series was a top-25 fixture in the US during its first three seasons, first airing Wednesday at 8:30 p.m., then at 8:00. It was moved to Tuesdays at 9 p.m. during its third season where it experienced a dramatic ratings lift thanks to a lead-in of the then red-hot Who Wants to Be a Millionaire. As ratings for that series waned in 2000/2001, Dharma & Greg suffered a similar fate, compounded by NBC moving Frasier into the same time slot. As Millionaire fell even further and was moved off the night in the fall of 2001, ABC tried to rebuild a Tuesday night comedy block consisting of Dharma & Greg, What About Joan?, Bob Patterson, and Spin City. Bob Patterson and What About Joan? were quickly cancelled while Dharma & Greg and Spin City shared the 8 p.m. hour for the rest of the season.

The final episode aired on April 30, 2002, to 6.8 million viewers, compared to the 20 million the series had peaked two years previously. Along with Ally McBeal and Dawson's Creek, Dharma & Greg was one of the last three surviving shows to debut during the 1997–98 season (Dawson's Creek would remain for one more season in 2002–03).

Home media
Season 2 was released in Australia as a Region 4 PAL on January 22, 2008, with a picture of Dharma and Greg dancing on the cover. It is available in Japan as a Region 2 NTSC format with a picture of them sitting down for the cover art. In the spring of 2008, the second season was released in Europe (Netherlands) as a Region 2 PAL as well. All countries have different covers, and all are using the "dance shot".

On November 11, 2014, 20th Century Fox released season 2 in Region 1 via Amazon.com's CreateSpace program. This is a Manufacture-on-Demand (MOD) release, available exclusively through Amazon.com.

Vanity cards 
The vanity card for Chuck Lorre Productions at the end of each episode included a message written by producer and show co-creator Chuck Lorre, expressing his personal views on a variety of subjects. Because the card only appeared on the screen for a brief moment, it was usually readable only by those who recorded the program and paused it (although the complete collection of cards has now been posted on Lorre's website).

Messages were also included on the vanity cards for later Chuck Lorre Productions shows, such as Two and a Half Men, The Big Bang Theory, and Mike & Molly.

Crossovers 
Elfman and Gibson had a cameo appearance in the 2011–12 season premiere episode Two and a Half Men "Nice to Meet You, Walden Schmidt". Their characters are not named either in the dialogue or the credits (possibly for legal reasons due to Mens being produced by a different studio), but they appear to be based on Dharma and Greg. While the couple remain married, Greg seems overly tired of his responsibilities and marriage, even going so far as to sarcastically hint at divorce to Evelyn Harper (along with a self-inflicted gunshot gesture) when leaving. Joel Murray also makes a cameo appearance in the episode, although not as Pete but as a character named "Doug". Elfman had also previously appeared on that show in its first season as the free-spirited Frankie in the two-part episodes "Round One to the Hot Crazy Chick" and "That Was Saliva, Alan."

References

External links

 
 Vanity card archive for Dharma & Greg
 The D&G Experience (Fan Site) 

1990s American sitcoms
1997 American television series debuts
2000s American sitcoms
2002 American television series endings
American Broadcasting Company original programming
English-language television shows
Fictional married couples
Television duos
Television series about families
Television series about marriage
Television series by 20th Century Fox Television
Television series created by Chuck Lorre
Television shows set in San Francisco